Sydney Howard Vines FRS (31 December 1849 – 4 April 1934) was a British botanist and academic. He was Sherardian Professor of Botany at Oxford University from 1888 to 1919, and served as president of the Linnean Society of London from 1900 to 1904. He directed the publication of the Annals of Botany from 1887 to 1899.

Education and career
Vines studied at Christ's College, Cambridge, obtaining his Bachelor of Science in 1873, Bachelor of Arts in 1876, Master of Arts in 1879, and his doctorate in 1883. He became a member of the Linnean Society of London in 1885.

Works
Vines' works include:

Science Lectures at South Kensington (1878),

Text-book of Botany, Morphological and Physical (1892), 

An Elementary Text-book of Botany: From the German of Dr. K. Prantl  (1898), The Dillenian Herbaria, (1907).

Additional information
His parents birthnames were William Reynolds and Jessie Robertson. He married an Agnes Bertha Perry in 1884.  The Vines, Oxford was built for him. He was the father of the author and academic Sherard Vines.

References

1849 births
1934 deaths
Presidents of the Linnean Society of London
Fellows of the Royal Society
Alumni of Christ's College, Cambridge
Sherardian Professors of Botany